Korutla  municipality (also Koratla) is the second largest town and revenue division in the Jagtial district in the Indian state of Telangana. It is a historical town ruled by Jain Kings and second largest town in Jagtial district. It is the headquarters of Koratla constituency.

Geography 
Korutla Municipality covers an area of 34.12 square kilometers (13.17 square miles), at an elevation of 287 meters (942 ft).

History 
It is believed that Korutla was its name during Nizam's era, previously known as Koravattu. The great story of korutla was revealed by an old stone inscription (shilashasanam), written in 1042-1068 A.D was found in the holy pond (koneru) of korutla. As per the writings and opinions of people here, korutla has got thousands of years of history. 100 decades ago it was ruled by great kings of Jainas, Kalyanis, Chalukyas, Vemulawada Chalukyas and Rastrakutas.

In the era of Jaina's, it was called "Koravattu". As the days were passing, it changed to "Koravatlu", and "Koratlu", and finally changed the present name Korutla. In Telugu it is written as Korutla, but in English it is written both as "Korutla" and "Koratla". Another belief is that the people (Sages and Saints) belong to the tribe of "Koravattu", used to live here and performed their devotional activities in this place

Demographics 
As of 2011 Indian census, Korutla had an estimated population of 66,504 But approximately in 2018 the population is 85,000. 
The gender split is 50 percent male, 50 percent female. 
The Literacy rate is 60 percent—approximately equal to the national average of 59.5 percent. Male literacy is 69 percent, and female literacy is 51 percent. 
14% of the population is under six years old.

Koratla Vagu Syphon 
This Syphon is second one in Asia. It is situated in Nagulapet of Korutla. This Siphon was built by Engineer Sri P.S.Ramakrishna Raju under Pochampad Project.

Temples 
Sri Mahadevaswamy Temple: This temple is said to be constructed  900 years ago
Sri Shirdi Sai Baba temple: Korutla is said to be Second Shirdi because of the statue size is large after Statue of Sai Baba in Shirdi. This temple is situated in the entrance of town from Jagtial
Sri Venkateshwara Swamy Temple: Recently in 2019 a bird neither eagle nor owl gave darshan in the form of Garuda Swamy in Korutla. It is Situated in Jawahar Colony, Korutla
Sri Asta Lakshmi temple: This temple is situated in Adarsha Nagar Colony, Korutla
Sri Gyana Saraswati Ayyappa Swamy Temple: It is situated in Allamaih Gutta Colony, Korutla. In Korutla every year 27 December Ayyappa Jatara is Celebrated
Sri Siddi Vinayaka Temple: This temple is situated near Sri Venkateshwara Temple in Jawahar Colony, Kortla. Here it is believed that Statue drunk milk in olden days
Hanuman Temple : This temple is situated on main road, One of the famous temple in korutla

Mosques
 Jam-E-Masjid
 Masjid-E-maka.masjid
 Masjid-E-Muzdalfa
 Masjid-E-Eidgah

Government and politics 
Korutla Municipality was constituted in 1988 and is classified asa second-grade municipality with 33 election wards. Korutla is the headquarters of its own assembly constituency.

Transportation 

It has TSRTC bus stand. [KRTL]
The buses travel to Hyderabad, Warangal, Karimnagar, Nizamabad, Tirupati, Pamur , Kanigiri etc.

It has Railway Connectivity i.e., Peddapalli–Nizamabad line. Connectivity to Mumbai ,  Visakhapatnam , Delhi ,  Chennai. 
Korutla Railway Station .Station code[KRLA]

The trains are: (77259/60) Karimnagar-Nizamabad-Karimnagar DEMU Passenger,  (57601/02) Kacheguda-Karimnagar-Kacheguda Passenger and (11205/06) Mumbai LTT-Karimnagar-Mumbai LTT.

References 

Cities and towns in Jagtial district
Mandal headquarters in Jagtial district